Augusta Airport may refer to:

Augusta Municipal Airport in Augusta, Kansas, United States (FAA: 3AU)
Augusta Regional Airport at Bush Field, in Augusta, Georgia, United States (FAA/IATA: AGS)
Augusta State Airport in Augusta, Maine, United States (FAA/IATA: AUG)
Augusta Airport in Augusta, Western Australia, Australia (ICAO: YAUG)
Daniel Field, the original municipal airport of Augusta, Georgia